Alexandra Nereïev born Alexandra Gil; 1 May 1976, is a French painter, sculptor, jewelry-maker and writer living in Pully, Switzerland. Nereïev was born in Le Chesnay, France and was graduated from the art school Maryse Eloy Maryse Eloy in 1999.

She left France in 2011 to move to Locarno and then moved to French Switzerland in 2013.

Fondator of the workshop gallery Latzarine in Lagny sur Marne, France open from 2002 to 2006 where most of her expositions take place.

Her approach remains faithful to the figurative art, her favourite themes being self-portraits, nudes and landscapes. The artist regularly frequent the free sketch workshop of the Académie de la Grande Chaumière in Paris.

Expositions 

 2003 – "La féerie" Latzarine Gallery 24 rue Vacheresse, Lagny sur Marne, France.
 2004 – "Monde organique" Latzarine Gallery 24 rue Vacheresse, Lagny sur Marne, France.
 2005 – "Divergences et cruauté" public reading of poems, piano concert and fine stone made jewelry exposition. Latzarine Gallery 24 rue Vacheresse, Lagny sur Marne, France.
 2006 – "Retour à la Nature" exposition of a fleeting canvas destined to be destroyed. Latzarine Gallery, 24 rue Vacheresse, Lagny sur Marne, France.
 2009 – "Private sellings in La Sauvagine, France.
 2011 – "Hommage à Patricia" Private selling in La Toretta, Ascona, Switzerland.

Major works 

 2000 – Toscane – Oil painting
 2000 – Les trois grâces – Oil painting triptych.
 2001 – Nu à la Grande Chaumière – Oil painting
 2006 – Fumeuse d'opium – Oil painting
 2011 – Femme au gant rouge (inspired by Isabelle Huppert in the movie "My little princess") – Oil painting
 2012 – Roussalka- Oil painting
 2013 – Nudité à Kiel – Oil painting

Limited print run books 

 La saga des Ruskova – self-edited novel written in 2009
 Feuilles d'ambre et poudre à Canons – self-edited novel written in 2012 –

Sources 
 Alexandra Nereïev's official website 
 http://typofonderie.com/gazette/post/rudi-meyer-peter-keller/ 
 elica editions
 Cercle d'art contemporain du Cailar France

1976 births
Living people
People from Le Chesnay
20th-century French painters
French jewellery designers
21st-century French painters